The 2014 Arizona Wildcats baseball team represented the University of Arizona in the 2014 NCAA Division I baseball season. The Wildcats played their home games for the 3rd season at Hi Corbett Field. The team was coached by Andy Lopez in his 13th season at Arizona.

Personnel

Roster

Coaches

Opening day

Schedule and results

2014 MLB draft

References 

Arizona
Arizona Wildcats baseball seasons
Arizona baseball